The Women's Marathon at the 2002 European Championships, which were held in Munich, Germany, took place on August 10, 2002.

Medalists

Abbreviations
All times shown are in hours:minutes:seconds

Records

Intermediates

Final ranking

See also
 2002 Marathon Year Ranking
 2002 European Marathon Cup

References
 Results
 todor66
 marathonspiegel

Marathon
Marathons at the European Athletics Championships
2002 marathons
Women's marathons
European Athletics Championships marathon
Marathons in Germany
Women in Munich